Krzysztof Sobolewski (born 20 September 1978 in Radymno) is a Polish politician and former local government official who is the chair of the Executive Committee of Law and Justice, in office since 2018.

He holds a degree in administration from the Faculty of Law and Administration of Maria Curie-Skłodowska University. Having joined Law and Justice in 2003, he initially worked for Marek Kuchciński in Przemyśl. From 2005 to 2007 he was employed in the Podkarpackie Voivodeship Office in Rzeszów. From 2014 to 2018, Sobolewski sat on the council of the central borough of the City of Warsaw.

In 2018 he replaced Joachim Brudziński (who had been appointed as the Minister of Interior and Administration) as chair of the Executive Committee of Law and Justice. Sobolewski was elected as a member of the Sejm in the 2019 parliamentary vote in Rzeszów. He is the chair of the Polish-Ukrainian Parliamentary Group.

References

Law and Justice politicians
21st-century Polish politicians
Living people
1978 births